Il Successo (also known as The Success) is a 1963 Italian comedy film directed by Mauro Morassi. It is considered an unofficial sequel of Dino Risi's Il Sorpasso, with Vittorio Gassman and Jean-Louis Trintignant reprising their roles with slight changes. The same Risi directed part of the film.

Cast 
Vittorio Gassman: Giulio Cerioni
Jean-Louis Trintignant: Sergio
Anouk Aimée: Laura
Maria Grazia Spina : Diana
Cristina Gajoni: Maria 
Filippo Scelzo: Francesco Cerioni 
Gastone Moschin: Romeo
Leopoldo Trieste: Grassi 
Riccardo Garrone: Giancarlo
Mino Doro: Cesaretto 
Daniele Vargas: Consouler   
Annie Gorassini: Marisa
Umberto D'Orsi: Lallo
Franca Polesello: Carla
Carlo Bagno: Varelli

References

External links

1963 films
Italian comedy films
1963 comedy films
Commedia all'italiana
Films scored by Ennio Morricone
Films with screenplays by Ruggero Maccari
1960s Italian-language films
1960s Italian films